is a passenger railway station located in the town of  Kaiyō, Kaifu District, Tokushima Prefecture, Japan. It is operated by the third-sector Asa Kaigan Railway and bears the station number "TK29".

Lines
Only local trains stop at the station.

Layout
The station consists of a side platform serving an elevated track. An unused siding runs alongside but is not connected to the main track. The station building within the elevated structure houses a waiting area and a ticket window. This also doubles as a travel centre and acts as an agent for various types of travel tickets including those for JR Shikoku. The platform has a small shelter for waiting passengers and can be accessed by steps or an elevator. Car and bicycle parking is available and bike rentals are offered.

Just south of the station, a siding branches off the track and leads to the depot of the Asa Kaigan railway.

Adjacent stations

History
The station was opened on 26 March 1992 by the third sector Asa Kaigan Railway as the only intermediate station along the three station Asatō Line.

Passenger statistics
In fiscal 2011, the station was used by an average of 38 passengers daily.

Surrounding area
Kaiyo Town Hall Shishikui Government Building

See also
 List of Railway Stations in Japan

References

External links

Asatetsu home page

External links
 Asa Kaigan Railway Official website 

Railway stations in Tokushima Prefecture
Railway stations in Japan opened in 1992
Kaiyō, Tokushima